Susan A. Gelman (born July 24, 1957) is currently Heinz Werner Distinguished University Professor of psychology and linguistics and the director of the Conceptual Development Laboratory at the University of Michigan. 
Gelman studies language and concept development in young children.  
Gelman subscribes to the domain specificity view of cognition, which asserts that the mind is composed of specialized modules supervising specific functions in the human and other animals. Her book The Essential Child is an influential work on cognitive development.

Gelman was elected to the American Academy of Arts & Sciences in 2008 and the National Academy of Sciences in 2012. She has served as the President of the Society for Philosophy and Psychology (2018)  and the President of the Cognitive Development Society (2005-2007).  Gelman is a founding co-editor of the journal the Annual Review of Developmental Psychology.

Education
Gelman received her B.A., Psychology and Classical Greek from Oberlin College in 1980, and her Ph.D. in psychology, with a Ph.D. minor in Linguistics from Stanford University in 1984. Her PhD advisor was Ellen Markman.

Career
Gelman is currently the Heinz Werner Distinguished University Professor of psychology and linguistics and the director of the Conceptual Development Laboratory at the University of Michigan.

She was previously the Frederick G. L. Huetwell professor of psychology at the University of Michigan, Ann Arbor.

Research
Gelman directs the Conceptual Development Lab in the Psychology Department of the University of Michigan. Most of the studies conducted at the lab focus on children between the ages of 2 and 10, and are carried out in a home-like laboratory setting or in local preschools and middle schools.

Gelman is the author of over 200 publications in psychology research or related articles. Her research focuses on cognitive development, language acquisition, categorization, inductive reasoning, causal reasoning, and the relationship between language and thought.

Her books include:

Essentialism
Gelman has been a major contributor to essentialism and relating essentialist ideas to varying aspects in psychology.  Gelman's work within the two fields share a familiar subsection: development of children. Her work has established that children, within a given age range, are able to detect underlying essences or root causes for predicting observed behaviors. Gelman's work has yielded insights into how children acquire language. Her book The Essential Child: Origins of Essentialism in Everyday Thought is an influential work on cognitive development and essentialism that has been cited more than 2000 times.

Research areas and topics of interest 
 Developmental psychology
 Cognitive development
 Language acquisition
 Categorization and inductive reasoning
 Psychological essentialism
 Social categories; Ownership, Authenticity, and Object history
 Parent-child conversations
 Semantic development
 Causal reasoning
 Relations between language and thought

Awards
2022, elected to the American Association for the Advancement of Science.
 2016, G. Stanly Hall Award for Distinguished Contribution to Developmental Psychology, Division 7, American Psychological Association. 
 2012, elected to the National Academy of Sciences
 2012, Developmental Psychology Mentor Award, Division 7, American Psychological Association  
2008, elected to the American Academy of Arts & Sciences 
 2007–2008, James Mckeen Cattell Fund Fellowship, Association for Psychological Science
 2005, Eleanor Maccoby Book prize from Division 7 at the American Psychological Association for The Essential Child: Origins of Essentialism in Everyday Thought (2003) 
 2005, inaugural Best Authored Book Award, Cognitive Development Society. for The Essential Child  (2003)
 1996, J. S. Guggenheim Fellowship
 1992,  Robert L. Fantz Award, American Psychological Foundation
 1992, Distinguished Scientific Award, American Psychological Association, for Early career Contribution to Psychology

Family
Her younger brother is the statistician Andrew Gelman of Columbia University.  The cartoonist Woody Gelman was her uncle.

References

External links
The Conceptual Development Lab at University of Michigan
 

American women psychologists
21st-century American psychologists
Developmental psycholinguists
Women cognitive scientists
Fellows of the American Academy of Arts and Sciences
Oberlin College alumni
Stanford University alumni
University of Michigan faculty
1957 births
Living people
Members of the United States National Academy of Sciences
Fellows of the Cognitive Science Society
American women academics
Annual Reviews (publisher) editors
21st-century American women
20th-century American psychologists
Fellows of the American Association for the Advancement of Science